Bangaru Adigalar is a South Indian spiritual guru. He is the President of Adiparasakthi Charitable Medical Educational and Cultural Trust. He is called 'Amma', meaning mother in Tamil, by his followers and devotees of the Adhiparasakthi temple.

Arulthiru Bangaru Adigalar is believed to be the Poorna Avatar (holding all 16 qualities of an Avatar) and is believed to be the incarnation of the supreme power – Adhiparasakthi by his followers. He has a large following of believers. Bangaru adigalar has also implemented reforms in temple and spiritualism.

The government of India awarded him with Padma Shri in 2019 for his service to humanity.

Income tax raid 
Bangaru Adigalar's Adhiparasakthi group of educational institutions, as well as his four residences and trust offices in Melmaruvathur, were raided by sixteen IT teams on July 2, 2010. The search began at 11.30 a.m. on July 2nd and lasted until 4 a.m. the next day. Adigalar's house alone had cash worth  confiscated. In addition, gold jewellery was also uncovered on the property.

References 

1940 births
Gurus
Living people
Recipients of the Padma Shri in other fields